Granite Mountain is an igneous intrusion southeast of Little Rock, Arkansas. Despite being named after granite, the rock at Granite Mountain is actually syenite, a rock that is visually similar to granite, but contains much less quartz. The rock was formed in the Cretaceous period around 90 million years ago, after the lamproites at Prairie Creek and the later Magnet Cove complex, and before the formation of the Monroe Uplift and Jackson Dome.

References 

Igneous petrology
Cretaceous Arkansas
Geology of Arkansas
Subterranea of the United States
Geography of Little Rock, Arkansas